Unbothered is the second studio album by American rapper Lil Skies. It was released on January 22, 2021, by All We Got Entertainment and Atlantic Records. The album features guest appearances from Wiz Khalifa and Lil Durk. The deluxe version was released on May 14, 2021. It features additional guest appearances from Trippie Redd, Zhavia Ward, and Drakeo the Ruler. It follows Skies' previous album, Shelby (2019).

Background
In an interview with Complex, Skies elaborated on the album, explaining:I just hope people take away from my album—just from me in general—is to just chase your dreams, and don't let nobody tell you what to do. I'm learning that still myself. I got a lot of people around me in my life tellin' me what I should do, what I shouldn't do… Do what you love, man. Life is too short.

The title of the album is a self-analysis of Skies, that nothing can distract him from doing what he is doing. The cover art depicts him in a room that is filled with items that are distracting, in which he sits down in a chair, thinking about his ideas. He chose Wiz Khalifa and Lil Durk to appear on the album as they are some of his most favorite artists. As with Shelby (2019), the project that was released before Unbothered, it only contains a few features for Skies to showcase his own talent.

Release and promotion
Skies announced the album along with its title, cover art, and release date in an Instagram post on December 16, 2020. The track listing was revealed three days before its release, on January 19, 2021.

Singles
Skies released the album's lead single, "Havin My Way", which features fellow American rapper Lil Durk, on March 4, 2020. It was followed by the second single, "Riot", which was released on May 14, 2020. The third single, "On Sight", was released on November 6, 2020. "Ok" was released as the fourth and final single on December 16, 2020. The lead single of the deluxe edition of the album, "My Baby", which features American singer Zhavia Ward, was released on April 29, 2021.

Critical reception

Writing for Clash, Robin Murray felt that "every element on the album feels exact, placed with real precision"; Murray specifically praised the singles "Ok" and "Havin My Way", the latter of which features Lil Durk, opining that the album is an "inward journey" and the two singles exemplify that, while complimenting the songs "Trust Nobody", "Riot", and "Think Deep Don't Sink".

Track listing

Personnel
Credits adapted from Tidal.

Musicians
 Lil Skies – primary artist 
 Wiz Khalifa – featured artist 
 Lil Durk – featured artist 
 Trippie Redd – featured artist 
 Zhavia Ward – featured artist 
 Drakeo the Ruler – featured artist

Technical

 Samantha Kossoff – assistant mixing 
 Chris Athens – mastering 
 Neek – mixing , mastering 
 Joe Fitz – mixing , mastering 
 Based1 – programming 
 Jakik – programming 
 Hagan – programming 
 CashMoneyAP – programming 
 Slim Pharaoh – programming 
 Buddah Bless – programming 
 Sprite Lee – programming 
 Vendr – programming 
 Gibbo & Armada – programming 
 Pvlace – programming 
 Danny Wolf – programming 
 Rello – programming 
 Steeze – programming 
 Noahsaki – programming 
 MVA Beats – programming 
 Neel & Alex – programming 
 Nils – programming 
 LMC – programming 
 T-Minus – programming 
 Cubeatz – programming

Charts

References

2021 albums
Lil Skies albums
Albums produced by Cubeatz
Albums produced by T-Minus (record producer)
Atlantic Records albums